Brussels South Charleroi Airport (BSCA), also unofficially called Brussels-Charleroi Airport, Charleroi Airport or rarely Gosselies Airport,  is an international airport, located in Gosselies, a part of the city of Charleroi in the Province of Hainaut in Wallonia, Belgium. In terms of passengers and aircraft movements, it is the second busiest airport in Belgium having served 8,224,196 passengers in 2019 (82,043 movements). It is also a busy general aviation airfield, being home to 3 flying schools.

The Aéropole, one of the Science Parks of Wallonia, is located near the airport.

History

Early years

The first aeronautical activities in Gosselies date back to 1919 as a flying school, then aeronautical maintenance activities the following year. The British aircraft manufacturer Fairey Aviation settled a subsidiary Avions Fairey on the site (then known as Mont des Bergers) in 1931.

During World War II, the site was arranged as an Advanced Landing Ground (A-87) for the allied air forces, from 14 September 1944 until 10 August 1945.

Gosselies airfield became a public aerodrome after World War II, but the main activities of the site remained aeronautical constructions (installation of SABCA in 1954, then SONACA in 1978, taking the place of Fairey).

In the 1970s, the Belgian national airline Sabena launched a Liège–Charleroi–London service, but this was soon dropped because of poor results. Gosselies was left with almost no passenger traffic, the airport being mainly used for private or pleasure flights, training flights and occasional charters to leisure destinations around the Mediterranean Sea or to Algeria.

Development since the 1990s
Operations at Brussels South Charleroi grew in the 1990s, with a new commercial management structure (BSCA – Brussels South Charleroi Airport) and the arrival of Irish low-cost airline Ryanair in 1997, which opened its first continental base at Charleroi a few years later.

Although criticised for the subsidies paid by the Walloon government to help its installation, Ryanair opened new routes from Brussels South Charleroi (they also closed two destinations: London–Stansted and Liverpool, although Stansted was re-introduced in June 2007 before being suspended again). Other low-cost carriers later joined Ryanair in Brussels South Charleroi, such as Wizz Air. The Polish airline Air Polonia operated services from here to Warsaw and Katowice before going bankrupt in August 2004.

In September 2006, it was announced that Moroccan low-cost airline Jet4you would launch three weekly flights to Casablanca (on Wednesday, Thursday and Sunday) starting 1 November 2006, in code-share cooperation with Belgian airline Jetairfly.

A new terminal opened in January 2008. It has a capacity of up to 5 million passengers a year, which means that it has reached its maximum capacity in 2010 (5,195,372 passengers). 

The European Commission objected to assistance the airport offered to Ryanair, since the airport is owned by the Wallonia regional government and thus the discounts and other benefits could be considered state aid. However, the Court of First Instance (a European Union court) decided on 17 December 2008 that the Commission's decision finding that illegal aid had been granted to Ryanair should be annulled and quashed as being erroneous in law. However, in March 2012, the Commission reopened the case in order to take this judgment into account.

In January 2017, a second terminal (Terminal 2) was opened in order to relieve the T1 during rush hours and to be able to accommodate 10 million passengers a year in the future.

In May 2019, work began on an extension of Charleroi Airport’s runway, bringing it to a total length of 3200 metres. Runway 06/24 is undergoing a 650 meter extension on the 24 end of the runway.

On Friday 8 October 2021, the runway extension was officially inaugurated in the presence of the Walloon Minister in charge of Airports 

The SABCA facility on site conducts depot-level maintenance, repair and overhaul work on United States Air Force F-16s based in Europe.

Airlines and destinations

The following airlines operate regular scheduled and charter flights at Brussels South Charleroi Airport:

Statistics

Ground transportation

Bus
There are several shuttles to different cities in the neighbouring countries (Luxembourg, Metz, Thionville, Lille) plus a regular coach service that runs from the airport to Brussels-South railway station. Also, a special bus (Airport Express – A) operates from the airport to Charleroi-South railway station. A combined bus and train ticket to any other Belgian railway station can be bought in the terminal.

Car
The airport is accessible by the A54/E420 highway

Accidents and incidents
 On 4 april 1978, a Boeing 737 OO-SDH operated on a training flight with an instructor and two co-pilot students. Both students were going to practice ILS approaches to runway 25 at Charleroi-Gosselies Airport (CRL) followed by a touch-and-go. The initial six approaches were uneventful. The students then changed seats. The second student's first approach and touch-and-go were uneventful. During the second touch-and-go a flock of birds (ring doves) were observed crossing the runway. Several birds were ingested as the airplane was rotating. The instructor took over control and attempted to continue takeoff. The airplane failed to respond to his control inputs and seemed to decelerate. He then decided to abort the takeoff. There was insufficient runway length available so the Boeing overran, struck localiser antennas and skidded. The right main gear collapsed and the no. 2 engine was torn off in the slide. The aircraft came to rest 300 m past the runway end and was destroyed by fire.
 On 8 April 2011, a Dutch F-16 had to make an emergency landing because of a technical failure of one of its sets of landing gear. The plane landed on its belly. The pilot did not suffer any injuries.
 On 9 February 2013, a small Cessna plane crashed near the runway after suffering technical problems during take-off, killing all 5 people on board. The airport was closed for about six hours before resuming services.

See also
 Brussels Airport
 Transportation in Belgium

References

Notes

External links

 

Buildings and structures in Charleroi
Transport in Charleroi
Airports in Hainaut (province)
Airports in Brussels
Airfields of the United States Army Air Forces in Belgium
World War II airfields in Belgium
Airports established in 1919
1919 establishments in Belgium